Claudia Naomi Webbe (born 8 March 1965) is a British politician who is currently the Member of Parliament (MP) for Leicester East. Elected to Parliament for Labour in the 2019 general election, she currently sits as an independent.

Born in Leicester, Webbe was a councillor in the London Borough of Islington from 2010 until her resignation in March 2021, having served as its cabinet member for environment and transport. She was a member of the National Executive Committee of the Labour Party from 2016 until her election to Parliament. Webbe is the first female MP for Leicester East.

She was suspended from the party whip in September 2020 after being charged with harassment of a woman who was having an affair with her then-partner. She was later expelled from the Labour Party on 3 November 2021 after being convicted in October 2021. Webbe lost her appeal on 26 May 2022.

Early life and education
Webbe has described how she was born and brought up in Leicester to parents of African descent who migrated from Nevis to the UK around the time of the Windrush generation.

She went to King Richard III Secondary school, now Fullhurst Community College, in south-west Leicester.  She attended Lanchester Polytechnic from 1983 to 1986, gaining a BSc degree in Mathematics, Statistics and Computers.

She studied Social Science at Leicester Polytechnic, and a PG Diploma in Socio-Legal Studies (Children) at the University of Nottingham, followed by Race and Ethnic Relations at Birkbeck, University of London. She is a member of the Chartered Management Institute and the Institute of Leadership and Management, with a Certificate in Safer Recruitment from the Children's Workforce Development Council in June 2010, and a National Certificate for Licensing Practitioners from the BIIAB (British Institute of Innkeeping) in September 2010.

Operation Trident 
Webbe is a founder and former Chair of Operation Trident, a community-led initiative created in the mid-1990s to tackle the disproportionate effects of gun violence on black communities. In 2010, it was reported that Operation Trident would be disbanded as part of spending cuts.

In February 2013, Trident was reformed as the Trident Gang Crime Command to focus on youth violence, with the police chairing the Trident Independent Advisory Group itself. Webbe opposed the change, and called it "a backwards step on race".

Early political career
Webbe was a policy director and adviser to the Mayor of London, Ken Livingstone.

Webbe stood for election as a councillor in Islington in 2006 but was unsuccessful. She was elected as a Labour councillor to Islington London Borough Council in 2010, representing Bunhill ward. She was re-elected in 2014 and 2018. She served as the council's executive member for the environment and transport. Webbe resigned as Islington councillor in March 2021.

Considered to be a close ally of the then Labour Party leader, Jeremy Corbyn, Webbe was elected to the Labour Party's National Executive Committee (NEC) with support from the Momentum organisation in 2016, finishing third in the ballot with 92,377 votes. In 2018, she was shortlisted to become the Labour candidate in the Lewisham East by-election, but finished third in a vote among local party members and was not selected. In July 2018, she was elected as chair of the NEC Disputes Panel. In 2018 Webbe was re-elected to the NEC, finishing second in the ballot with 83,797 votes. She became ineligible to retain her NEC membership upon being elected to Parliament.

Parliamentary career
She was selected as the Labour candidate for Leicester East for the 2019 general election; the party's incumbent MP, Keith Vaz, had stood down after being suspended from Parliament for six months. Her selection resulted in the resignation of the Constituency Labour Party chair, who described it as "a fix", and some in the local British Indian community were angry that one of their candidates was not interviewed. Some saw it as a Momentum-led imposition of a left-wing candidate on a traditionally centrist constituency party. Webbe was elected with a majority of 6,019. This compared with a 22,428 Labour majority in the seat in 2017; the Labour Party nationally suffered its worst election results since 1935.

Webbe sat on the Backbench Business Committee in the House of Commons between March 2020 and April 2021. , she sits on the Environmental Audit Committee, the Foreign Affairs Committee, and the Committee of Arms Export Control. She is also an "alternate member" of the UK delegation to the Organization for Security and Co-operation in Europe. As of January 2020, she is a member of the Socialist Campaign Group of Labour MPs.

In February 2021, Webbe apologised after an investigation by the Parliamentary Commissioner for Standards found that she had broken the Code of Conduct for MPs by her late registrations of remunerations received for her role as a councillor in Islington. The Commissioner also noted the late registration of a payment received from a business. Also in 2021, Webbe stated on Twitter that "Earth is overpopulated; there are too many rich people. To solve the climate crisis; the rich must be abolished", a remark that drew criticism in view of her £81,000-per-year MP's salary.

Harassment conviction
On 28 September 2020, Webbe was charged with harassment of a woman between 1 September 2018 and 26 April 2020. She was placed on unconditional bail to appear at Westminster Magistrates' Court. She was suspended from the Labour whip pending the outcome of the case. On 11 November 2020, Webbe pleaded not guilty. The harassment was directed at a woman who was having an affair with her partner, and allegedly included a threat to send 'naked' photographs of the victim to her children. The threats also allegedly included Webbe saying "You should be acid".

Webbe was found guilty on 13 October 2021. District Judge Paul Goldspring, the Chief Magistrate, said her evidence was "untruthful", and that her defence was "vague, incoherent and at times illogical". A further hearing took place on 4 November 2021, when she was sentenced to 10 weeks imprisonment, suspended for two years, and 200 hours of unpaid work. The Labour Party had called on her to resign from Parliament at the time of her conviction, and she was expelled from the party on the day she was sentenced.

Webbe appealed against the conviction and the appeal hearing commenced at Southwark Crown Court on 19 May 2022. Her appeal was dismissed on 26 May 2022, though her sentence was reduced to eighty hours of community service, and compensation to the victim reduced from £1,000 to £50. The judge found that Webbe had not "made a threat to throw acid over" Michelle Merritt. The judge stated Merritt was an "unsatisfactory witness" who had "told lies". The reduced sentence means that Webbe will not be at risk of losing her seat following a recall petition from her constituents.

References

External links

 

1965 births
21st-century British women politicians
Alumni of Birkbeck, University of London
Alumni of Coventry University
Alumni of De Montfort University
British anti-racism activists
Black British MPs
Black British women politicians
British socialists
Councillors in the London Borough of Islington
English people of Saint Kitts and Nevis descent
English politicians convicted of crimes
Female members of the Parliament of the United Kingdom for English constituencies
Independent councillors in the United Kingdom
Independent members of the House of Commons of the United Kingdom
Labour Party (UK) MPs for English constituencies
Labour Party (UK) councillors
Labour Party (UK) officials
Living people
People convicted of harassment
Politicians from Leicester
UK MPs 2019–present
Politicians affected by a party expulsion process
Women councillors in England